The men's team recurve archery competition at the 2019 Summer Universiade was held in the Partenio Stadium, Avellino, Italy and the Royal Palace in Caserta, Italy between July 8 and 13.

Qualification round

Elimination round

References 

Men's team recurve